Asteroid Zoo is a citizen science project run by the Zooniverse and Planetary Resources, to use volunteer classifications to find unknown asteroids using old Catalina Sky Survey data. The main goals of the project are to search for undiscovered asteroids in order to protect the planet by locating potentially harmful Near-earth asteroids, locate targets for future asteroid mining, study the solar system, and study the potential uses and advantages of people looking through the images over computers.  It was created along with the ARKYD project through Kickstarter, funded with just over 1.5 million dollars.

The Asteroid Zoo community has exhausted the data that were available. With all the data examined they paused the experiment. Asteroid Zoo produced several scientific publications.

See also

Zooniverse projects:

References

Astronomy websites
Astronomy projects
Human-based computation
Citizen science
Internet properties established in 2014